Patruliidae is a family of radiolarians in the order Spumellaria.

Given its lineage, one could consider that it gave rise to the families Hagiastridae and Veghicycliidae, which are known to first appear in the early Carnian years.

References

External links 
 

Polycystines
Radiolarian families